Bonggo may be,

Bonggo language
Park Bonggo, runner
 Bonggo, a village in Sarmi Regency, Papua, Indonesia